Albert Rusnák may refer to:

 Albert Rusnák (footballer, born 1948) (cs), Czechoslovak footballer and football manager
 Albert Rusnák (footballer, born 1974), Slovak footballer and football manager
 Albert Rusnák (footballer, born 1994), Slovak footballer